Albano Narciso Pereira (21 December 1922 – 5 March 1990), known simply as Albano, was a Portuguese footballer who played as a forward.

Club career
Born in Seixal, Setúbal District, Albano joined Sporting CP in 1943 at the age of 20, from local Seixal FC. During his spell with the Lisbon club, he appeared in 334 games all competitions comprised and scored 162 goals, being part of an attacking line dubbed Cinco Violinos (Five Violins) that also included Jesus Correia, Fernando Peyroteo, José Travassos and Manuel Vasques and winning eight Primeira Liga championships and four Taça de Portugal trophies.

In the 1952–53 season, Albano netted a career-best 19 goals to help the Lions win the domestic league ahead of S.L. Benfica. He retired in 1957 at the age of 34, subsequently returning to his hometown.

International career
Albano won 15 caps for the Portugal national team over seven years, scoring three times. His debut came on 5 January 1947 in a 2–2 friendly draw against Switzerland, in the Portuguese capital.

References

External links

1922 births
1990 deaths
People from Seixal
Sportspeople from Setúbal District
Portuguese footballers
Association football forwards
Primeira Liga players
Seixal F.C. players
Sporting CP footballers
Portugal international footballers